Pelegrino Adelmo Begliomini (27 November 1914 – 10 October 2001), known as just Begliomini, was a Brazilian footballer. He played in six matches for the Brazil national football team from 1942 to 1945. He was also part of Brazil's squad for the 1942 South American Championship.

References

External links
 
 

1914 births
2001 deaths
Brazilian footballers
Brazil international footballers
Place of birth missing
Association football defenders
Sociedade Esportiva Palmeiras players
Sport Club Corinthians Paulista players
Fluminense FC players